Bradley Zaun (R-Urbandale) is an Iowa State Senator representing the 22nd District as well as the Iowa Senate President pro tempore. He was the Republican nominee for Iowa's 3rd congressional district in the 2010 general election.

Iowa Senate 
Zaun has served in the Iowa Senate since 2005.  He is the former mayor of Urbandale, serving from 1998 to 2005 and a former city council member of Urbandale, serving from 1996 to 1998. He is former owner of Zaun's Hardware and Vice President of R&R Realty Marketing Group, and received his Bachelor's degree from Grand View College.

Zaun currently serves on several committees in the Iowa Senate – the Judiciary committee; the Labor and Business Relations committee; the Rules and Administration committee; the Transportation committee; and the Ways and Means committee, where he is the ranking member. He also serves on the Justice Systems Appropriations committee.

In January 2017, Zaun proposed a bill to end tenure in public universities in Iowa.

Political campaigns

2008 

Zaun won with 23,190 votes, running unopposed.

2010 

In the 3rd District Republican primary, he won with 42% of the vote in a crowded seven-candidate field to face the  district's Democratic incumbent, Leonard Boswell.

Zaun eventually lost to the incumbent Boswell 46% to 51%.

2014 

After Republican Tom Latham of the newly-redistricted 3rd congressional district announced his retirement, Zaun ran to succeed him. Despite finishing first in the Republican primary with 10,522 votes (24.7%), he did not clear the 35% necessary to avoid a nominating convention. At the convention, after five ballots, Zaun was defeated by David Young, who had come fifth in the primary with 6,604 votes (15.5%).

On July 4, Zaun voiced his disappointment and suggested he would leave the Republican Party, leading some to encourage him to run for the seat as an Independent. He had previously announced that he would introduce legislation to hold runoff primary elections instead of conventions. On July 10, Zaun announced that despite his frustrations, he would not leave the Republican Party or run as an Independent.

2022 
Immediately after the Roe V Wade reversal was revealed by the Supreme Court of the United States, tens of demonstrators at the Iowa Capital shared Zaun's opinion that Iowa should quickly enact extreme measures before the public has a chance to voice their opinion through the voting process by calling a special session of the Iowa Legislature.

Legal difficulties 
On February 19, 2021, Zaun was found with a handgun at the Des Moines International Airport. The Des Moines Police Department confirmed that the gun was found on the Republican senator during his screening. Police said Zaun does have a permit to carry. Zaun was cited for violating Iowa ordinance 22-55.

References

External links 
Zaun for Congress congressional campaign site
Senator Brad Zaun official Iowa Legislature site
Senator Brad Zaun official Iowa General Assembly site
Senator Brad Zaun at Iowa Senate Republican Caucus
 
Campaign contributions at OpenSecrets.org

1962 births
21st-century American politicians
Grand View University alumni
Iowa city council members
Republican Party Iowa state senators
Living people
Mayors of places in Iowa
People from Urbandale, Iowa
University of Iowa alumni